Aristolochia thwaitesii is a species of plant in the family Aristolochiaceae. It is endemic to China.

References

Flora of China
thwaitesii
Vulnerable plants
Taxonomy articles created by Polbot